The abbreviation E&P may stand for:

 Editor & Publisher - a monthly magazine about newspapers in North America
 Exploration and production, sector of the oil-and-gas industry